Nicholas Monroe and Maciek Sykut were the defending champions but decided not to participate.
Facundo Bagnis and Federico Delbonis defeated Fabiano de Paula and Stefano Ianni 6–3, 7–5 in the final to win the title.

Seeds

Draw

Draw

References
 Main Draw

Seguros Bolivar Open Barranquilla - Doubles
2013 Doubles